Talíře nad Velkým Malíkovem is a 1977 Czechoslovak science fiction comedy film directed by Jaromil Jireš. The film starred Josef Kemr.

References

External links
 

1977 films
1970s science fiction comedy films
1970s Czech-language films
Czechoslovak science fiction comedy films
Films directed by Jaromil Jireš
Czech science fiction comedy films
1977 comedy films
1970s Czech films